Netmarble Corp. (Korean: 넷마블 주식회사) is a South Korean mobile game developer. It is South Korea's largest mobile-gaming company which was founded in 2000 by Bang Jun-hyuk.

Overview
Netmarble developed  Lineage 2 Revolution in 2015 and released to the public that same year. As of 2019 L2R became one of the highest-grossing mobiles in the market; exceeding 924 million dollars in 11 months since its release. Currently, Netmarble continues to update and bring new content to L2R.

Netmarble produces role-playing  mobile games. As of 2015, it had more than 3,000 employees and served over 120 countries worldwide. In May 2017, Bang took the company public, raising $2.4 billion.

Netmarble has developed mobile games including Seven Knights, Raven (Evilbane in the U.S.) and Everybody's Marble. It also claims a large shareholder stake in SGN, a casual game developer, and has a strategic partnership with CJ ENM.

Since 2015, the company has licensed Disney-owned properties to produce games such as Marvel: Future Fight (2015), Disney Magical Dice (2016), and Star Wars: Force Arena (2017).

In 2018, Netmarble named Park Sean as its new CEO. Park, the former chief strategy officer of the operator of KakaoTalk, co-headed Netmarble with incumbent chief Kwon Young-sik.

In April 2018, Netmarble acquired 25.71% in Big Hit Entertainment, the agency of Korean boy group BTS and TXT, becoming its second largest shareholder. As of 2021, Netmarble owns 19.31% of the Big Hit Entertainment after it changed its name to HYBE Corporation

Netmarble and Disney's partnership significantly deteriorated near the end of 2018 when the former announced that it can no longer support Disney Magical Dice and Star Wars: Force Arena, and eventually shut down both games, leaving Future Fight as the only Disney-based game it supports.

In February 2021, the company acquired Los Angeles based developer Kung Fu Factory.

On August 20, 2021, the company established a subsidiary label known as Metaverse Entertainment which partnered up with Kakao Entertainment to manage musical artists. On January 25, 2023, the label debuted a virtual girl-group known as Mave:.

As of 2021, Netmarble shareholders consisted of Bang Jun-hyuk (24.12%), CJ ENM (21.78%), Tencent (Han River Investment Pte. Ltd.) (17.52%), NCsoft Corp. (6.8%) and Others (29.78%).

Games

References

South Korean companies established in 2000
Netmarble
NCSoft
Tencent
Mobile game companies
Video game companies established in 2000
Video game companies of South Korea
Video game development companies
Video game publishers
Companies based in Seoul